Askar Abildaev (born 16 June 1971) is a retired Kazakh football forward.

Club career

In Soviet times
He started playing football at the age of nine. At this age, he began to train in the training group of Shakhter Karagandy.

He played his debut match for Shakhter Karagandy in 1986.

After playing three seasons at Shakhter, in 1991 he was exchanged to Kairat for Vladimir Minkin.

After the collapse of the USSR

After the collapse of the Soviet Union, Abildaev became the champion of Kazakhstan and the owner of the Cup of Kazakhstan in the first year of his stay at Kairat.

After "Kairat" in 1994, Abildaev moved to the Ansat Pavlodar. After playing one season at Ansat, he returned to his native Shakhter Karagandy, where he ended his career.

International career

Abildayev made his debut in the main national team of Kazakhstan on 1 June 1992 in a match against Turkmenistan. He scored his first and only goal for the national team in a match against the same Turkmenistan on 14 September 1992. In general, Abildaev played 7 matches for the national team and scored 1 goal.

Managerial career

Served as executive director of Shakhtar Karaganda from 2008 to 2010 and from 2016 to 2017

From 2017 to 2018 held the post of Director of Kaspi Football Club.

From September 2022 to November 2022 served as Advisor to the General Director of FC Astana.

References

External links

1971 births
Living people
Kazakhstani footballers
Kazakhstan international footballers
FC Shakhter Karagandy players
FC Kairat players
FC Irtysh Pavlodar players
Association football forwards